Bruce Tarbox (May 10, 1939 – March 6, 1979) was an American football guard. He played for the Los Angeles Rams in 1961. In 1979, Tarbox died of a heart attack while playing tennis.

References

1939 births
1979 deaths
American football guards
Syracuse Orange football players
Los Angeles Rams players
People from Nyack, New York
Sports deaths in Pennsylvania